Standardized Patient is an Iranian comedy-drama television series directed by Saeed Aghakhani and written by Bahram Tavakoli, which aired on IRIB TV1 on 2016 for 14 episodes. the series aired during Nowruz.

Plot
It's a modern and new method of treatment that has been used in psychology in recent years. In this method, a person by playing a role as a mental patient gets acquainted with the spirits and behavior of these patients. This method, in addition to aspects The therapy, has dramatic and fascinating themes and incorporates a direct concept of role-playing.

In the standardized patient, the protagonist is Behnam (Babak Hamidian) who has studied acting and is involved in this treatment throughout his life.

Cast 
Babak Hamidian as Behnam
Javad Ezzati as Omid
Alireza Khamseh as Nader
Shila Khodadad as Taraneh Meshki
Hossein Moheb Ahari as Poorbana
Pouria Poursorkh as Jahan
Nima Shahrokh Shahi as Mehrdad
Afsaneh Chehreh Azad as Shahnaz
Omid Rouhani as Dr. Nadery
Behnaz Akbarian as Negar
Atefeh Bagheri as Gelareh
Rouhollah Kamani as Shahab
Behrad Kharazi as Bijan
Ezatollah Mehravaran as Behnams's Father
Fariba Jedikar as Shirin
Siroos Meimanat as Behnam's Uncle and Sahar's Father
Afsaneh Naseri as Meli, Sahar's Mother
Amir Ghafarmanesh as Babak
Naeeme Nezamdoost as Farib
Ali Milani as Esmaili
Safar Kooshkli as Khojasteh
Afshin Sangchab as Davood's Inmate
Asghar Heidari as Farkhandeh
Arash Mirahamdi as The Magician
Hossein Zamani as Nami
Hossein Erfani as Sabeti
Mahyar Mashiri Afshar as Arya

References

Iranian television series